Mansour Al-Mousa is a Saudi Arabian football player. He was born on October 29, 1972, in Unaizah in Saudi Arabia and plays in the position of striker. He played for Al-Najma as a midfielder from 1990 And joined from 1983. and he One of the winners of 1989 FIFA U-17 World Championship.

International goals

References

1972 births
Living people
Saudi Arabian footballers
Saudi Arabia international footballers
Association football midfielders
People from Unaizah
Al-Najma SC players
Al Nassr FC players
Saudi Professional League players